Women's College, Tinsukia, established on the 9th of July, 1966. It is a women's general degree college situated in Tinsukia, Assam. The college is affiliated with the Dibrugarh University. At present with the 2(f) and the 12(B) status of the UGC, the College has flourished into a multi faculty institution offering Arts and Commerce programs with fifteen hundred students and more than hundred teaching and non teaching faculties. A full-fledged study centre of the IGNOU and one Distance Education centre of the Dibrugarh University housed in the institution offer various courses at distance mode to aspiring students.

New campus 
Recently a new plot of land has been acquired by the College, where a New Campus is being developed utilizing grants received from the Rashtriya Uchchatar Shiksha Abhiyan – RUSA.

References

Universities and colleges in Assam
Colleges affiliated to Dibrugarh University
Educational institutions established in 1966
1966 establishments in Assam